Per Aspera is a city-building game developed by Tlön Industries and published by Raw Fury for Windows on December 3, 2020. The player takes the role of AMI, an artificial intelligence with the objective of terraforming Mars for human colonization.

Gameplay
The game features a branching nonlinear story and multiple endings.

Release
Per Aspera was announced in June 2019 at the PC Gaming Show. An expansion pack, Green Mars, was released on October 21, 2021. A second expansion, Blue Mars, was released on May 2, 2022. A third expansion, Home, was released on January 23, 2023. The game was released on Meta Quest 2 on February 9, 2023.

Reception

Per Aspera received "generally favorable" reviews according to review aggregator Metacritic.

Davide Pessach of Italian Eurogamer said that "Per Aspera is a very interesting colony builder narrative game that has a stellar esthetic, a very engaging story and a super cast of actors. The gameplay is fluid, rewarding and rich of surprises and references to cool tech (both fictional and kinda realistic). If you like the genre and the setting you will have a blast."

Jonathan Bolding of PC Gamer summarized: "Per Aspera's novel adaptation of nonlinear narrative to fit a strategy game goes over surprisingly well. Combined with a novel terraforming mechanic, slick aesthetics, hard science chops, and classic genre gameplay, this one is definitely worth the time."

Martynas Klimas of PC Invasion said that "Per Aspera reaches for lofty heights, but I could never shake the impression that the difficulties I encountered were more because of the game breaking down rather than Mars being a hostile place. But who knows, patches do wonders these days."

References

External links

Per Aspera at Tlön Industries

2020 video games
City-building games
Hard science fiction
Indie video games
Meta Quest games
Single-player video games
Video games developed in Argentina
Video games set on Mars
Video games with downloadable content
Video games with expansion packs
Video games with Steam Workshop support
Windows games
Raw Fury games